Josie Russell may refer to:
Josie Russell (Home and Away), fictional character from Australian TV soap opera Home and Away
Josie Russell, British woman who, as a child, was attacked by Michael Stone but survived